R. Panneerselvam (born 10 April 1970) is an Indian/Tamil action film director. His films include Renigunta (2009) starring the actor known as Johnny. In 2016 his film Renigunta was later remade & released in Kannada as Mandya to Mumbai.

His film 18 Vayasu is about a mentally unstable youngster who falls in love and was made with the same team who made Renigunta.

He was the associate director of N. Linguswamy, an Indian film director; he worked on Lingusamy's action films Run (2002), Ji (2005), Sandakozhi (2005) and Bheema (2008).

Filmography
Renigunta (2009)
18 Vayasu (2012)
Karuppan (2017)
Iswarya Murugan (2022)
Naan Thaan Siva (delayed)

References

Living people
Film directors from Tamil Nadu
Tamil film directors
1970 births
People from Namakkal district